The economic concept of a capital good (also called complex product systems (CoPS), and means of production) is as a "...series of heterogeneous commodities, each having specific technical characteristics ..." in the form of a durable good that is used in the production of goods or services. Capital goods are a particular form of economic good and are tangible property.

A society acquires capital goods by saving wealth that can be invested in the means of production. People use them to produce other goods or services within a certain period. Machinery, tools, buildings, computers, or other kinds of equipment that are involved in the production of other things for sale are capital goods. The owners of the capital good can be individuals, households, corporations, or governments. Any material used to produce capital goods is also considered a capital good.

Capital goods are one of the three types of producer goods, the other two being land and labour.  The three are also known collectively as "primary factors of production". This classification originated during the classical economics period and has remained the dominant method for classification.

Many definitions and descriptions of capital goods production have been proposed in the literature. Capital goods are generally considered one-of-a-kind, capital intensive products that consist of many components. They are often used as manufacturing systems or services themselves. Examples include hand tools, machine tools, data centers, oil rigs, semiconductor fabrication plants, and wind turbines. Their production is often organized in projects, with several parties cooperating in networks (Hicks et al. 2000; Hicks and McGovern 2009; Hobday 1998).

A capital good lifecycle typically consists of tendering, engineering and procurement, manufacturing, commissioning, maintenance, and (sometimes) decommissioning.

Capital goods are a major factor in the process of technical innovation. 
 All innovations—whether they involve the introduction of a new product or provide a cheaper way of producing an existing product—require that the capital goods sector shall produce a new product (machine or physical plant) according to certain specifications. - Rosenberg, Capital Goods, Technology, and Economic Growth (1963)

Capital goods are a constituent element of the stock of capital assets, or fixed capital and play a key role in the economic analysis of "... growth and production, as well as the distribution of income..."

Immaterial capital goods 

Capital goods can also be immaterial, when they take the form of intellectual property. Many production processes require the intellectual property to (legally) produce their products. Just like material capital goods, they can require substantial investment, and can also be subject to amortization, depreciation, and divestment.

Differences from consumer goods 
People buy capital goods to use as static resources to make other goods, whereas consumer goods are purchased to be consumed.

For example, an automobile is a consumer good when purchased as a private car.

Dump trucks used in manufacturing or construction are capital goods because companies use them to build things like roads, dams, buildings, and bridges.

In the same way, a chocolate bar is a consumer good, but the machines that produce the candy are capital goods.

Some capital goods can be used in both production of consumer goods or production goods, such as machinery for the production of dump trucks.

Consumption is the logical result of all economic activity, but the level of future consumption depends on the future capital stock, and this in turn depends on the current level of production in the capital-goods sector. Hence if there is a desire to increase consumption, the output of the capital goods should be maximized.

Importance 
Capital goods, often called complex products and systems (CoPS) (Gann and Salter 2000; Hobday 2000), play an important role in today's economy (Acha et al. 2004). Aside from allowing a business to create goods or provide services for consumers, capital goods are important in other ways. In an industry where production equipment and materials are quite expensive, they can be a high barrier to entry for new companies. If a new business cannot afford to purchase the machines it needs to create a product, for example, it may not be able to compete as effectively in the market. Such a company might turn to another business to supply its products, but this can be expensive as well. This means that, in industries where the means of production represent a large amount of a business's start-up costs, the number of companies competing in the market is often relatively small.

Investment required 
The acquisition of machinery and other expensive equipment often represents a significant investment for a company. When a business is struggling, it often puts off such purchases as long as possible, since it does not make sense to spend money on equipment if the company is not around to use it. Capital spending can be a sign that a manufacturer expects growth or at least a steady demand for its products, a potentially positive economic sign. 
In most cases, capital goods require a substantial investment on behalf of the producer, and their purchase is usually referred to as a capital expense. These goods are important to businesses because they use these items to make functional goods for customers or to provide consumers with valuable services. As a result, they are sometimes referred to as producers' goods, production goods, or means of production.

In international trade 
In the theory of international trade, the causes and nature of the trade of capital goods receive little attention. Trade-in capital goods is a crucial part of the dynamic relationship between international trade and development. The production and trade of capital goods, as well as consumer goods, must be introduced to trade models, and the entire analysis integrated with domestic capital accumulation theory.

See also

Physical capital
Capital (economics)
Means of production
Consumer goods

§ Listed in The New Palgrave Dictionary of Economics

References

Further reading

Articles
 Hagemann, Harold, 1987.  "capital goods", The New Palgrave: A Dictionary of Economics, 1st Edition.

Capital (economics)
Factors of production
Management cybernetics